Radiant, is a motor yacht built in 2009 by Lürssen.

Design
Radiant'''s exterior was designed by Tim Heywood and her interior by Glen Pushelburg. The hull is built of steel and the superstructure is made of aluminium, with teak laid decks. The yacht is Lloyd's registered, issued by Cayman Islands.

Amenities

Zero speed stabilizers, elevator, swimming pool, beach club, helicopter landing pad on the top deck, massage room, swimming platform, tender garage with tender, air conditioning, on deck jacuzzi, gym, and movie theatre.

Engines
She is powered by twin 8,715hp MTU 16V 1163 TB73L diesel engines. She has  fuel tanks.

History
Court case
After her delivery there was a lawsuit against the previous owner who sold the yacht to Abdulla Al Futtaim in 2008. He failed to pay a commission fee to the broker, Edmiston. The judge ruled in favour of Edmiston, ruling that the yacht owner should pay Edmiston their commission.

See also
 Al Raya''
 Luxury yacht
 List of motor yachts by length
 List of yachts built by Lürssen

References 

2009 ships
Motor yachts